Tommy Gregory Thompson is an American treasure hunter known for his leading role in the discovery of the wreck of the SS Central America on September 11, 1988. He is also the author of a book about the discovery, America's Lost Treasure, published in 1998, and is a main character in the best-selling 1998 non-fiction book Ship of Gold in the Deep Blue Sea by Gary Kinder.

In 2000, Thompson sold gold recovered from the Central America for $52 million.
In 2009 he had an offshore account in the Cook Islands valued at $4.16 million. In 2013, the U.S. District Court for the Southern District of Ohio issued an arrest warrant for Thompson for civil contempt for his failure to appear as directed. In 2014, the same court issued an additional arrest warrant for Thompson for criminal contempt. The investigation was assigned to Deputy United States Marshal Mark Stroh of the Southern District of Ohio. Thompson was a fugitive for several years before U.S. Marshals arrested him in 2015 at a West Palm Beach, Florida hotel, together with fellow fugitive Alison Louise Antekeier.

In November 2018, Thompson agreed to surrender 500 gold coins salvaged from the wreck of the Central America, but then claimed he did not have access to the missing coins. On 28 November 2018, a jury awarded investors $19.4 million in compensatory damages: $3.2 million to the Dispatch Printing Company (which had put up $1 million of a total of $22 million invested) and $16.2 million to the court-appointed receiver of the other investors.

Recovery expedition
According to the Tampa Bay Times, while Thompson discovered the wreck of the SS Central America in 1988, he did not receive legal authorization to salvage the wreck until 2003.

He used the Arctic Discoverer as his expedition vessel, which deployed a remotely controlled vehicle, the Nemo.

Serving his sentence
On December 19, 2020, The New York Times, and several other publications, published retrospective articles to mark the fifth anniversary of his conviction.  Steven Tigges, the lawyer for one of the investors who sued Thompson, said he could expect release as soon as he handed over the missing funds. As of February, 2023 he was still in jail.

References

Further reading
 Kinder, Gary (1998). Ship of Gold in the Deep Blue Sea. Grove Press.

External links 
 CHRISTOPHER KOULOURIS, Tommy G Thompson 3 ton treasure: $1000 fine a day until he gives it up / scallywag and vagabond DECEMBER 15, 2016
 Chris Ryan, Nothing Gold Can Stay? How Tommy Thompson Lost His Golden Ticket and Gained Decades of Legal Turmoil / Ocean and Coastal Law Journal Volume 21, Number 1, Article 10, January 2016
 Kyle Anne Uniss, Ex-Treasure Hunter Given Ultimatum for Gold Coins Ex-Treasure Hunter Given Ultimatum for Gold Coins Courthouse News April 25, 2017

Treasure hunters
1952 births
Living people